Goodland is an unincorporated community in Goodland Township, Itasca County, Minnesota, United States.

The community is located east-southeast of Grand Rapids at the junction of Itasca County Roads 16 and 20; and State Highway 65 (MN 65). The boundary line between Itasca and Saint Louis counties is nearby.

Nearby places include Pengilly, Swan River, Warba, Wawina, and Silica. Goodland is located six miles north of Swan River and 12 miles south of Pengilly. Goodland is 19 miles east-southeast of Grand Rapids; and 22 miles southwest of Hibbing.

The community of Goodland is located within Goodland Township (population 466). Floodwood Lake is nearby. Goodland is 24 miles northwest of Floodwood and 25 miles west-northwest of Meadowlands.

Goodland ZIP code 55742.

Demographics

See also
 Goodland Township

References

 Rand McNally Road Atlas – 2007 edition – Minnesota entry
 Official State of Minnesota Highway Map – 2011/2012 edition
 Mn/DOT map of Itasca County – Sheet 1 – 2011 edition

Unincorporated communities in Itasca County, Minnesota
Unincorporated communities in Minnesota